The 2002 Los Angeles Dodgers season was the 113rd for the franchise in Major League Baseball, and their 45th season in Los Angeles, California. The season saw Dan Evans take over as General Manager and in his first season the team won 92 games and was not eliminated from post season contention until the next-to-last day of the season, finishing third overall in the West Division of the National League. Shawn Green hit 42 home runs to become the first Dodger to have back-to-back 40 or more homer seasons. He had four homers in one game on May 23 against the Milwaukee Brewers. He went 6-for-6 in that game and set a Major League mark for total bases with 19. The number broke the previous record of 18 total bases set by Joe Adcock. Éric Gagné, a former starter, was turned into the closer and proceeded to set a club record for saves with 52. This is also their first season to be broadcast on KCOP (13).

Offseason
 November 9, 2001: Acquired Omar Daal from the Philadelphia Phillies for Jesus Cordero and Eric Junge.
 December 13, 2001: Acquired César Izturis and Paul Quantrill from the Toronto Blue Jays for Luke Prokopec and Chad Ricketts.
 December 21, 2001: Acquired Dave Roberts from the Cleveland Indians for Christian Bridenbaugh and  Nial Hughes.
 January 15, 2002: Acquired Andrew Brown, Odalis Pérez and Brian Jordan from the Atlanta Braves for Gary Sheffield.
February 21, 2002: Tim Crabtree was signed as a free agent.
 March 23, 2002: Acquired Guillermo Mota and Wilkin Ruan from the Montreal Expos for Matt Herges and Jorge Nunez.

Regular season

Season standings

National League West

Record vs. opponents

Opening Day lineup

Notable transactions
 July 22, 2002: Acquired Jolbert Cabrera from the Cleveland Indians for Lance Caraccioli.
 July 23, 2002: Acquired Tyler Houston and Brian Mallete from the Milwaukee Brewers for Ben Diggins and Shane Nance.
 July 25, 2002: Acquired Tom Farmer and Jason Frasor from the Detroit Tigers for Hiram Bocachica.
 July 28, 2002: Acquired Paul Shuey from the Cleveland Indians for Francisco Cruceta, Terry Mulholland and Ricardo Rodríguez.

Roster

Starting Pitchers stats
Note: G = Games pitched; GS = Games started; IP = Innings pitched; W/L = Wins/Losses; ERA = Earned run average; BB = Walks allowed; SO = Strikeouts; CG = Complete games

Relief Pitchers stats
Note: G = Games pitched; GS = Games started; IP = Innings pitched; W/L = Wins/Losses; ERA = Earned run average; BB = Walks allowed; SO = Strikeouts; SV = Saves

Batting Stats
Note: Pos = Position; G = Games played; AB = At bats; Avg. = Batting average; R = Runs scored; H = Hits; HR = Home runs; RBI = Runs batted in; SB = Stolen bases

2002 Awards
2002 Major League Baseball All-Star Game
Éric Gagné reserve
Odalis Pérez reserve
NL Pitcher of the Month
Éric Gagné (June 2002)
NL Player of the Month
Brian Jordan (September 2002)
NL Player of the Week
Odalis Pérez (April 15–21)
Shawn Green (May 20–26)

Farm system 

Teams in BOLD won League Championships

Major League Baseball Draft

The Dodgers selected 52 players in this draft. Of those, nine of them would eventually play Major League baseball. They gained a supplemental first round pick and an extra second round pick as compensation for losing pitcher Chan Ho Park to the Texas Rangers as a free agent.

With their first round pick, the Dodgers selected first baseman James Loney from Lawrence E Elkins High School in Missouri City, Texas. Loney would make it to the Majors in 2006 and was the Dodgers primary starting first baseman until he was traded in 2012. He hit 71 home runs and drove in 451 RBI in his seven seasons with the Dodgers, while hitting .284.  The supplemental first round pick was left handed pitcher Greg Miller from Esperanza High School in Anaheim, California. Miller was a highly touted prospect
and the 2003 Dodgers minor league pitcher of the year after he went 11-4 with a 2.49 ERA in 21 starts for the Vero Beach Dodgers. However, he missed the entire 2004 season with an arm injury and was never able to regain his touch. In eight minor league seasons (the last in the independent American Association) he was 24-15 with a 3.89 ERA in 221 games (53 starts).

This was a fairly successful draft, after several sub-par drafts that proceeded it. Also drafted this season were relief pitcher Jonathan Broxton (second round), starting pitchers James McDonald (11th round, drafted as a first baseman) and Eric Stults (15th round) and catcher Russell Martin (17th round, drafted as a second baseman).

References

External links 
2002 Los Angeles Dodgers uniform
Los Angeles Dodgers official web site
Baseball-Reference season page
Baseball Almanac season page

Los Angeles Dodgers seasons
Los Angeles Dodgers